Saha Airlines is an Iranian airline based in Tehran that operates scheduled domestic flights.

History

The company was established in 1990 as Saha Airline and is wholly owned by the Islamic Republic of Iran Air Force. It operates domestic passenger services using Boeing 737-300 aircraft, and cargo charters carried out with Boeing 747 freighters when required. Saha Airlines was the last civil operator of the Boeing 707 in the world.

On 3 May 2013, all flight operations were suspended. Saha Airlines began operating again in 2017.

Destinations
Saha Airlines serves the following destinations (as of March 2017):

Fleet
As of January 2019, the Saha Airlines fleet consisted of the following aircraft:

Accidents and incidents
On 20 April 2005, Saha Airlines Flight 171, a Boeing 707-320C, registration EP-SHE, flying from Kish Island, crashed on landing at Mehrabad Airport, Tehran following an unstabilised approach with a higher than recommended airspeed. Gears and/or a tire failed after touchdown and the flight overran the far end of the runway. Of the 12 crew and 157 passengers on board, three passengers were killed.
On 14 Jan 2019, a Boeing 707 freighter crashed near Karaj, Iran The plane was supposed to land at Payam International Airport, but the crew mistakenly landed at Fath Air Base. Of the 16 people on board, only one survived. The aircraft was the last 707 in commercial service worldwide.

References

External links

Airlines of Iran
Airlines established in 1990
Iranian companies established in 1990